Khyber Girls Medical College (KGMC) is the first public sector medical college for girls in Khyber Pakhtunkhwa which came into existence in May 2004 as a female Campus of KMC Peshawar. It was declared as an independent college in December 2005, and is recognized by Pakistan Medical & Dental Council in December 2008.

History
Initially this project was launched in the name 'Girl campus of Khyber Medical College' with the first batch of 50 students during the academic session 2004-05. Later, the then Chief Minister Khyber Pakhtunkhwa Akram Khan Durrani  announced the conversion of 'Girls campus of KMC Peshawar' as an independent medical college with the name of 'Khyber Girls Medical College' with effect from 8 December 2005. KGMC is ranked as one of the top medical college of the province Khyber Pakhtunkhwa.

References

External links
Official website

Universities and colleges in Peshawar District
Medical colleges in Khyber Pakhtunkhwa
Khyber Medical University
2004 establishments in Pakistan
Public universities and colleges in Khyber Pakhtunkhwa
Universities and colleges in Peshawar
Educational institutions established in 2004